John Connor is an American politician who served as a Democratic member of the Illinois Senate and Illinois House of Representatives.

Political career
In 2017, Connor was appointed to the Illinois House of Representatives. Connor assumed the position following the resignation of Emily McAsey in June 2017. He served the remainder of McAsey's term until early 2019. As a prosecutor, Connor has been involved in high-profile cases, such as the Drew Peterson case. Connor's term came towards the end of the Illinois state budget crisis, when the House ruled 71–42 to override Governor Bruce Rauner's veto of a state budget package. Connor was one of six Democrats to vote no.

In the 2020 general election, Connor successfully ran for the Illinois Senate seat being vacated by fellow Democrat Pat McGuire. Connor was succeeded in the Illinois House by Democrat Dagmara Avelar.

He resigned from the Senate on April 29, 2022, and Eric Mattson was appointed to replace him on May 6, 2022.

References

External links
 Profile at Illinois General Assembly

Living people
People from Lockport, Illinois
University of Notre Dame alumni
University of Illinois College of Law alumni
Democratic Party members of the Illinois House of Representatives
21st-century American politicians
Year of birth missing (living people)